"Only the World" is the debut single from American Idol finalist, Mandisa, from her True Beauty album.

It has given the artist her first number one on the Billboard Hot Singles Sales chart. It stayed on the chart for 49 weeks.

Track listing
 "Only the World" (Sam Mizell, Matthew West)
 "True Beauty" (Mandisa, Cindy Morgan, Drew Ramsey)

Charts

References

2007 songs
2007 debut singles
Mandisa songs
Songs written by Matthew West
Sparrow Records singles
Songs written by Sam Mizell